Betzenstein is a town in the district of Bayreuth, in Bavaria, Germany. It is situated in the Franconian Switzerland, 35 km northeast of Nuremberg.

References

Bayreuth (district)